Huang Ta-chou (born 7 February 1936), also known as Thomas Huang, is a Taiwanese politician who served as mayor of Taipei between 1990 and 1994. He chaired the Chinese Taipei Olympic committee from 1998 to 2006.

Early life
Huang was born in Shanhua, Tainan in Taiwan, Empire of Japan in 1936. He graduated from National Taiwan University, where Lee Teng-hui was once his instructor. He received his PhD in agriculture from Cornell University in the United States in 1971. After his return to Taiwan, Huang taught at National Taiwan University.

Political career
Later on, Huang also participated in politics. He was admired by Lee Teng-hui, who was helpful throughout Huang's political career. At 1979, Lee was the Mayor of Taipei and appointed him as the mayoral adviser and the Secretary-General of the Research, Development, and Evaluation Commission, Executive Yuan. Two years later, Lee became the chief executive of Taiwan Province, he followed Lee to Taiwan Provincial Government and was appointed the Deputy Secretary-General. He went back to National Taiwan University in 1984 as a professor, before he was appointed the Secretary-General of Taipei City Government in 1987. He became the acting Mayor of Taipei in May 1990, replacing Wu Poh-hsiung. In October, he was appointed Mayor of Taipei by President Lee Teng-hui. During the final year of Huang's term, under the pressure of democratization, the office of mayor became directly elected and Huang is the last Mayor of Taipei to have served via presidential appointment.

In the 1994 Taipei mayoral election, Huang received a late nomination from the Kuomintang. Though he secured the party's endorsement and support from Lee, Huang did not win the election. The loss could be partly ascribed to the split between the Kuomintang and Chinese New Party within the Pan-Blue Coalition. Although the entire Pan-Blue Coalition gained more votes, Huang only received 25.89% of the voter turnout, allowing Democratic Progressive Party candidate Chen Shui-bian to be elected in a traditional pro-Chinese unification city and Mainlander stronghold.

After he lost the mayoral election, Huang was appointed the Minister of the Research, Development, and Evaluation Commission in June 1996, and a Minister without Portfolio in 1997.

He was appointed National Policy Advisor by President Ma Ying-jeou in 2009.

Sports
Apart from politics, Huang also contributed a lot in sports. He was elected the President of Chinese Taipei Olympic Committee in 1997, followed by becoming the commissioner of Chinese Professional Baseball League upon invitation in 1998.

Academics
After his session in the Olympic Committee in 2005, he returned to his academic research in agricultural science. He invented a new method of nurturing strawberry. He is currently a professor of Toko University in Taiwan.

References

1936 births
Kuomintang politicians in Taiwan
Taiwanese people of Hoklo descent
Mayors of Taipei
Living people
Politicians of the Republic of China on Taiwan from Tainan
Chinese Professional Baseball League commissioners